The Richardton meteorite is a  H5 Ordinary chondrite that was seen to fall at 21:48 on 30 June 1918 between Mott, North Dakota and Richardton, North Dakota, United States.

In 1960 John Reynolds discovered that the Richardton meteorite had an excess of 129Xe, a result of the presence of 129I in the solar nebula.

Mineralogy

Classification

See also
 Glossary of meteoritics

References

External links
A combined chemical-petrological study of separated chondrules from the Richardton meteorite, N.M. Evensen et al., Lamont-Doherty Geological Observatory of Columbia University, Palisades, NY 10964 U.S.A., Earth and Planetary Science Letters 

Chondrite meteorites
Meteorites found in the United States
Geology of North Dakota